Aeroclub Argentino  is a public use airport located near San Justo, Buenos Aires, Argentina.

Google Earth Historical Imagery (9/1/2012) shows former grass Runway 16/34 was abandoned in 2012. Current Google Maps shows Runway 12/30 is unmarked.

See also

Transport in Argentina
List of airports in Argentina

References

External links 
OpenStreetMap - Aeroclub Argentino

Airports in Buenos Aires Province